Hush is a 2016 American slasher film directed and edited by Mike Flanagan, and starring Kate Siegel, who also co-wrote the film with Flanagan. The film co-stars John Gallagher Jr., Michael Trucco, Samantha Sloyan, and Emilia "Emma" Graves. It was jointly produced by Trevor Macy through Intrepid Pictures and Jason Blum through Blumhouse Productions.

The film had its world premiere at South by Southwest on March 12, 2016, and was released by Netflix on April 8, 2016. It received positive reviews from critics, who praised the performances and atmosphere.

The film has been remade twice in India, with both films, directed by Chakri Toleti, releasing in June and August 2019: the Hindi language Khamoshi, and the Tamil language Kolaiyuthir Kaalam. Midnight Mass, a miniseries based on the Hush story within a story of the same name, also created and directed by Flanagan, and starring Siegel, was released on Netflix on September 24, 2021.

Plot
Deaf-mute horror author Maddie Young lost her abilities to hear and speak after contracting bacterial meningitis at age 13. The disease caused permanent hearing loss and temporary vocal cord paresis which became permanent after unsuccessful surgery. Hoping to advance her writing career following her publication of the novel Midnight Mass and receiving international critical acclaim, Maddie leaves New York City and lives an isolated life in the woods with her white cat. Her friend Sarah visits her one evening to return a copy of her book, and they talk about her isolation and Sarah's desire to learn more sign language. Later that night, a masked killer with a crossbow attacks Sarah and chases her to Maddie's house. A bloodied Sarah bangs on the door shouting for help; she goes unnoticed by Maddie and the killer stabs Sarah 13 times resulting in her death.

The killer quickly deduces that Maddie is deaf and decides to try and make her another victim. He sneaks into her house and steals her phone, which he then uses to take pictures of her and send them to her. Maddie realizes she is being stalked and tries to call the police, but the killer cuts the power and punctures the tires on her car to prevent escape. Maddie writes "won't tell, didn't see face, boyfriend coming home" on the glass panel door with her lipstick. The killer responds by taking off his mask and revealing his face and—upon learning she can read lips—taunts her with the threat of waiting to break in. He then uses Sarah's corpse to knock on the window. Maddie uses her car keys to trigger her car alarm in an attempt to distract the killer so she can retrieve Sarah's phone from her corpse’s pocket, but is caught by him before she can grab it and quickly locks herself back inside.

While attempting to escape through the second-story window, Maddie is shot in the leg by the killer with a crossbow bolt, but she manages to knock him off the roof and steal the weapon. Sarah's boyfriend, John, arrives at Maddie's house looking for Sarah. The killer poses as a police officer responding to a call, but John grows suspicious of him. He plans to attack the killer from behind with a rock, but Maddie distracts him by banging on the window, allowing the killer to stab him in the neck. As John bleeds to death, he puts the killer in a chokehold to buy Maddie enough time to escape, but she realizes that she will either be caught or bleed to death. Her only chance for survival is to kill her assailant.

Outside, the killer threatens Maddie's cat with his knife, but she shoots him in the shoulder with the crossbow. As Maddie retreats into the house, the killer slams the sliding door on her wrist and crushes her hand beneath his boot. He allows Maddie to pull her mangled hand inside and close and lock the door. When he threatens to enter the house, Maddie writes "do it, coward" on the door with her own blood. As the killer begins bashing the door in with a tire iron, Maddie uses her laptop to type up a description of the man and a message to her family. She then locks herself in her bathroom, armed with a knife.

Failing to break through the door, the killer opts to crash through the bathroom skylight. Maddie does not notice him until he inadvertently breathes against her neck. She narrowly avoids his attack and stabs him in the knee. He follows her into the kitchen, where she blasts his face with insecticide and uses her visual smoke alarm to disorient him. He begins strangling her, but she finally kills him when she stabs him in the neck with a corkscrew. Maddie retrieves her cell phone from the man's body and dials 9-1-1. As she sits on her porch steps while the police approach her, Maddie pets her cat and smiles.

Cast

 Kate Siegel as Madison "Maddie" Young
John Gallagher Jr. as The Man
 Michael Trucco as John Stanley
 Samantha Sloyan as Sarah Greene
 Emma Graves as Max, Maddie's sister

Production
Nothing was known about the project until September 2015, when its existence was revealed at a buyers' screening at the 2015 Toronto International Film Festival. It was disclosed that Mike Flanagan had directed the film, and co-wrote it with his wife Kate Siegel, who also stars in it.

Flanagan said that he made the main character a deaf mute because he wanted to direct a film "without dialogue." The possibility of making the film entirely silent was briefly considered, but was soon abandoned when Flanagan had decided that building tension with this limitation would be "impossible." Flanagan also noted that the target audience would not have been used to silent films and, as such, would "seek out every kind of audio stimulus anywhere else in the environment" or simply choose to not watch the film.

The script itself consisted largely of scene directions, which Flanagan and Siegel developed by acting out in their own house. The fact that so much of the script was based around Flanagan and Siegel's house proved problematic for filming, as when they went to shoot the film in Alabama, they could not find a house similar enough to theirs and had to significantly alter the film's script.  Flanagan also found challenges in the single location and had to plan the cinematography to keep the film interesting to the audience, especially given the mute nature of the protagonist; to this end, Flanagan used a Steadicam to follow Siegel's every move, along with a boom mic and a spotter, to make the movement more "dynamic." The resulting audio for these scenes could not be used and had to be redone in post, with Flanagan noting that the audio initially "sounded like a herd of elephants."

To represent Maddie's world, various ambient sounds were used, such as the sound of ultrasound machines. Flanagan did not want to use pure silence for these scenes, as he still felt it would make viewers even more aware of their surrounding and take them out of the experience.  As a result of the aforementioned camera set in, Siegel had to ADR her own breath into the final film.  The film's soundtrack was composed by The Newton Brothers.

Release
Hush had its world premiere at South by Southwest on March 12, 2016. Prior to the premiere, Netflix acquired worldwide distribution rights to the film, which it released on April 8.

Reception
On the review aggregator website Rotten Tomatoes, the film holds an approval rating of 93% based on 40 reviews, with an average rating of 7.6/10. The site's critics consensus reads, "Hush navigates the bloody waters of home invasion thrillers and incisive slashers for a contemporary horror puree." At Metacritic, the film has a weighted average score of 67 out of 100, based on reviews from seven critics, indicating "generally favorable reviews."

Benjamin Lee of The Guardian said that Hush "offers ingenious suspense" and awarded it four out of five stars. Geoff Burkshire of Variety, though criticizing the film's third act, called it "one of the more inspired concoctions to emerge from the busy Blumhouse horror-thriller assembly line in recent years." Michael Gingold of Fangoria gave the film 3.5/4 stars, calling it "a good old-fashioned truly scary movie." Jasef Wisener of TVOvermind gave the film a 4.7/5, noting that "Thanks to the performances from its two leads, Hush succeeds in almost every aspect and delivers one of the best horror films in modern history." Richard Newby of the website Audiences Everywhere called the film "a modern slasher movie classic that's not to be missed."

Stephen King wrote about the film on April 20, 2016, saying, "How good is Hush? Up there with Halloween and, even more, Wait Until Dark. White knuckle time. On Netflix." Filmmaker William Friedkin, director of The Exorcist, also commented on the film, saying "HUSH is a great horror film...on Netflix. Terrifying."

Follow-ups

Remakes
In 2019, two separate remakes of Hush, directed by Chakri Toleti, were released in India: Kolaiyuthir Kaalam (Tamil) and Khamoshi (Hindi).

Miniseries
On September 24, 2021, Midnight Mass, a miniseries based on the Hush story within a story of the same name (the internationally acclaimed novel by deaf-mute horror author protagonist Madison "Maddie" Young), also created and directed by Flanagan, and starring Siegel, was released on Netflix.

See also
 List of films featuring home invasions
 List of films featuring the deaf and hard of hearing

References

External links
 
 

2016 films
2016 horror films
2016 thriller films
2016 horror thriller films
2010s psychological horror films
2016 psychological thriller films
2010s serial killer films
2010s slasher films
American horror thriller films
American psychological horror films
American psychological thriller films
American serial killer films
American Sign Language films
American slasher films
Blumhouse Productions films
Films about deaf people
Films about writers
Films directed by Mike Flanagan
Films produced by Jason Blum
Films scored by the Newton Brothers
Films shot in Alabama
Home invasions in film
Intrepid Pictures films
English-language Netflix original films
2010s English-language films
2010s American films